Hugh Cholmondeley, 1st Earl of Cholmondeley, PC (1662 – 18 January 1725), styled The Honourable from birth until 1681 and then known as Viscount Cholmondeley to 1706, was an English peer and politician.

Cholmondeley was the eldest son of Robert Cholmondeley, 1st Viscount Cholmondeley, and Elizabeth Cradock, and was educated at Christ Church, Oxford. In 1681 he succeeded his father as second Viscount Cholmondeley, but as this was an Irish peerage it did not entitle him to a seat in the English House of Lords. He supported the claim of William and Mary to the English throne, and after their accession in 1689 he was rewarded when he was made Baron Cholmondeley, of Namptwich in the County of Chester, in the Peerage of England (which gave him a seat in the House of Lords). The peerage was created with remainder to his younger brother George. In 1706 he was admitted to the Privy Council and made Viscount Malpas, in the County of Chester, and Earl of Cholmondeley, in the County of Chester, with similar remainder.

Lord Cholmondeley was appointed Comptroller of the Household by Queen Anne in 1708. He held this post only until October of the same year, when he was made Treasurer of the Household. He was stripped of this office in 1713 but restored when George I became king in 1714. He also served as Lord Lieutenant of Anglesey, Caernarvonshire, Denbighshire, Flintshire, Merionethshire and Montgomeryshire from 1702 to 1713 and from 1714 to 1725 and of Cheshire between 1703 and 1713 and 1714 and 1725.

Lord Cholmondeley died in January 1725. He never married and was succeeded in his titles by his younger brother George, who had already been elevated to the peerage in his own right as Baron Newborough.

See also
List of deserters from James II to William of Orange

References

Kidd, Charles, Williamson, David (editors). Debrett's Peerage and Baronetage (1990 edition). New York: St Martin's Press, 1990.

www.thepeerage.com

|-

|-

1662 births
1725 deaths
Alumni of Christ Church, Oxford
Lord-Lieutenants of Anglesey
Lord-Lieutenants of Caernarvonshire
Lord-Lieutenants of Cheshire
Lord-Lieutenants of Flintshire
Lord-Lieutenants of Denbighshire
Lord-Lieutenants of Merionethshire
Lord-Lieutenants of Montgomeryshire
Members of the Privy Council of Great Britain
Treasurers of the Household
Hugh
1
Peers of England created by William III